The Seven Sisters are a series of chalk sea cliffs on the English Channel coast, and are a stretch of the sea-eroded section of the South Downs range of hills, in the county of East Sussex, in south-east England. The Seven Sisters cliffs run between the mouth of the River Cuckmere near Seaford, and the chalk headland of Beachy Head outside of Eastbourne. The dips or swales that separate each of the seven crests from the next are the remnants of dry valleys in the chalk South Downs which are being gradually eroded by the sea.

Some of the cliffs and adjacent countryside make up the Seven Sisters Country Park, which is bounded on its inland side by the A259 road, and is itself a part of the larger South Downs National Park.

Cliffs
From west to east, the sequence starts just east of Cuckmere Haven. The cliff peaks and the dips between them are individually named.  Listed below, the peaks are in italics.  There are seven hills, with an eighth one being created by the erosion of the sea. 

Haven Brow 
Short Bottom
Short Brow
Limekiln Bottom
Rough Brow
Rough Bottom
Brass Point
Gap Bottom
Flagstaff Point (continuing into Flagstaff Brow)
Flagstaff Bottom
Flat Hill
Flathill Bottom
Baily's Hill
Michel Dean 
Went Hill Brow.

Just east of the last peak is Birling Gap. Beyond, on the top of the next hill, is Belle Tout Lighthouse and beyond that Beachy Head. A lighthouse in the sea marks the latter headland.

The South Downs Way runs along the edge of the cliffs, taking a very undulating course. Many landmarks around the area are named after the cliffs, including the Seven Sisters Sheep Centre.

Film and television

The Seven Sisters cliffs are occasionally used in filmmaking and television production as a stand-in for the more famous White Cliffs of Dover, since they are relatively free of anachronistic modern development and are also allowed to erode naturally. As a result, the Seven Sisters and Beachy Head remain a bright white colour, whereas the White Cliffs of Dover are protected due to the important port and are therefore increasingly covered in vegetation and are greening as a result. They are also featured at the beginning of the film Robin Hood: Prince of Thieves, and at the end of the film Atonement where Robbie and Cecilia always wanted to live.

The Seven Sisters are seen in the background of the Quidditch World Cup in 2005 film Harry Potter and the Goblet of Fire.

Much of the 2015 feature film Mr. Holmes was filmed around the Seven Sisters.

The 2019 film Hope Gap, starring Bill Nighy and Annette Bening was against the backdrop of Seaford Head. The film is named after the distinctive area of chalk cliff between Seaford and Cuckmere Haven. In 2020, Jessica Swale's feature film debut Summerland premiered, shot around the Seaford area, featuring numerous views of the Seven Sisters.

An east-facing photo of the Seven Sisters is included as one of the default landscape wallpapers packaged with Microsoft Windows 7.

References

Eastbourne
Geography of East Sussex
Nature Conservation Review sites
Country parks in East Sussex
Cliffs of England
Chalk landforms